This is a list of the Los Premios MTV Latinoamérica winners and nominees for Best MTV Tr3́s Artist.

Latin American music awards
MTV Video Music Awards